Lecithocera squalida is a moth in the family Lecithoceridae. It is found in Thailand, China (Hunan, Jiangxi, Sichuan) and Taiwan.

References

Moths described in 1987
squalida